The 1940 United States House of Representatives elections were elections for the United States House of Representatives to elect members to serve in the 77th United States Congress. They were held for the most part on November 5, 1940, while Maine held theirs on September 9. They coincided with President Franklin D. Roosevelt's re-election to an unprecedented third term. His Democratic Party narrowly gained seats from the opposition Republican Party, cementing their majority. However, the election gave firm control of the US House of Representatives and Senate to the New Dealers once again, as Progressives dominated the election.

The upswing in the economy that occurred following the Recession of 1937–38 encouraged voters that the New Deal plan had been working. This allowed the Democrats to stabilize their support.

, this is the last time the House of Representatives was made up of six parties.

Overall results

Source: Election Statistics - Office of the Clerk

Special elections 
Many special elections were held. The elected winner would serve only the remainder of the incumbent Congress. Sorted by election date.

|-
! 
| Carl Mapes
|  | Republican
| 1912
|  | Incumbent died December 12, 1939.New member elected February 19, 1940.Republican hold.Winner was subsequently re-elected in November, see below.
| nowrap | 

|-
! 
| William A. Ashbrook
|  | Democratic
| 19061920 1934
|  | Incumbent died January 1, 1940.New member elected February 27, 1940.Republican gain.Winner was subsequently re-elected in November, see below.
| nowrap | 

|-
! 
| Chester C. Bolton
|  | Republican
| 19281936 1938
|  | Incumbent died October 29, 1939.New member elected February 27, 1940.Republican hold.Winner was subsequently re-elected in November, see below.
| nowrap | 

|-
! 
| Cassius C. Dowell
|  | Republican
| 1936
|  | Incumbent died February 4, 1940.New member elected March 5, 1940.Republican hold.Winner was subsequently re-elected in November, see below.
| nowrap | 

|-
! 
| George H. Heinke
|  | Republican
| 1938
|  |  Incumbent died January 2, 1940.New member elected April 19, 1940.Republican hold.Winner did not run for re-election in November, see below.
| nowrap | 

|-
! 
| Clyde H. Smith
|  | Republican
| 1936
|  | Incumbent died April 8, 1940.New member elected June 3, 1940.Republican hold.Winner was subsequently re-elected in November, see below.
| nowrap | 

|-
! 
| W. Benjamin Gibbs
|  | Democratic
| 1938
|  | Incumbent died August 7, 1940.New member elected October 1, 1940.Democratic hold.Winner did not run for re-election in November, see below.
| nowrap | 

|-
! 
| William B. Bankhead
|  | Democratic
| 1916
|  | Incumbent died September 15, 1940.New member elected November 5, 1940.Democratic hold.Winner did not run for the next term, see below.
| nowrap | 

|-
! 
| John Andrew Martin
|  | Democratic
| 19081912 1932
|  | Incumbent died December 23, 1939.New member elected November 5, 1940.Democratic hold.Winner did not run for the next term, see below.
| nowrap | 

|-
! 
| colspan=3 | 
| New member elected November 5, 1940.Successor also elected the same day to the next term, see below.
| nowrap | 

|-
! 
| colspan=3 | 
| New member elected November 5, 1940.Successor also elected the same day to the next term, see below.
| nowrap | 

|-
! 
| colspan=3 | 
| New member elected November 5, 1940.Successor also elected the same day to the next term, see below.
| nowrap | 

|-
! 
| colspan=3 | 
| New member elected November 5, 1940.Successor also elected the same day to the next term, see below.
| nowrap | 

|}

Alabama 

|-
! 
| Frank W. Boykin
|  | Democratic
| 1935 
| Incumbent re-elected.
| nowrap | 

|-
! 
| George M. Grant
|  | Democratic
| 1938
| Incumbent re-elected.
| nowrap | 

|-
! 
| Henry B. Steagall
|  | Democratic
| 1914
| Incumbent re-elected.
| nowrap | 

|-
! 
| Sam Hobbs
|  | Democratic
| 1934
| Incumbent re-elected.
| nowrap | 

|-
! 
| Joe Starnes
|  | Democratic
| 1934
| Incumbent re-elected.
| nowrap | 

|-
! 
| Pete Jarman
|  | Democratic
| 1936
| Incumbent re-elected.
| nowrap | 

|-
! 
| William B. Bankhead
|  | Democratic
| 1916
|  | Incumbent died September 15, 1940.New member elected.Democratic hold.
| nowrap | 

|-
! 
| John Sparkman
|  | Democratic
| 1936
| Incumbent re-elected.
| nowrap | 

|-
! 
| Luther Patrick
|  | Democratic
| 1936
| Incumbent re-elected.
| nowrap | 

|}

Arizona 

|-
! 
| John R. Murdock
|  | Democratic
| 1936
| Incumbent re-elected.
| nowrap | 

|}

Arkansas 

|-
! 
| Ezekiel C. Gathings
|  | Democratic
| 1938
| Incumbent re-elected.
| nowrap | 

|-
! 
| Wilbur Mills
|  | Democratic
| 1938
| Incumbent re-elected.
| nowrap | 

|-
! 
| Clyde T. Ellis
|  | Democratic
| 1938
| Incumbent re-elected.
| nowrap | 

|-
! 
| William Fadjo Cravens
|  | Democratic
| 1939 
| Incumbent re-elected.
| nowrap | 

|-
! 
| David D. Terry
|  | Democratic
| 1933 
| Incumbent re-elected.
| nowrap | 

|-
! 
| William F. Norrell
|  | Democratic
| 1938
| Incumbent re-elected.
| nowrap | 

|-
! 
| Wade H. Kitchens
|  | Democratic
| 1936
|  | Incumbent lost renomination.New member elected.Democratic hold.
| nowrap | 

|}

California 

|-
! 
| Clarence F. Lea
|  | Democratic
| 1916
| Incumbent re-elected.
| nowrap | 

|-
! 
| Harry Lane Englebright
|  | Republican
| 1926
| Incumbent re-elected.
| nowrap | 

|-
! 
| Frank H. Buck
|  | Democratic
| 1932
| Incumbent re-elected.
| nowrap | 

|-
! 
| Franck R. Havenner
|  | Democratic
| 1936
|  | Incumbent lost re-election.New member elected.Republican gain.
| nowrap | 

|-
! 
| Richard J. Welch
|  | Republican
| 1926
| Incumbent re-elected.
| nowrap | 

|-
! 
| Albert E. Carter
|  | Republican
| 1924
| Incumbent re-elected.
| nowrap | 

|-
! 
| John H. Tolan
|  | Democratic
| 1934
| Incumbent re-elected.
| nowrap | 

|-
! 
| Jack Z. Anderson
|  | Republican
| 1938
| Incumbent re-elected.
| nowrap | 

|-
! 
| Bertrand W. Gearhart
|  | Republican
| 1934
| Incumbent re-elected.
| nowrap | 

|-
! 
| Alfred J. Elliott
|  | Democratic
| 1937 
| Incumbent re-elected.
| nowrap | 

|-
! 
| John Carl Hinshaw
|  | Republican
| 1938
| Incumbent re-elected.
| nowrap | 

|-
! 
| Jerry Voorhis
|  | Democratic
| 1936
| Incumbent re-elected.
| nowrap | 

|-
! 
| Charles Kramer
|  | Democratic
| 1932
| Incumbent re-elected.
| nowrap | 

|-
! 
| Thomas F. Ford
|  | Democratic
| 1932
| Incumbent re-elected.
| nowrap | 

|-
! 
| John M. Costello
|  | Democratic
| 1934
| Incumbent re-elected.
| nowrap | 

|-
! 
| Leland M. Ford
|  | Republican
| 1938
| Incumbent re-elected.
| nowrap | 

|-
! 
| Lee E. Geyer
|  | Democratic
| 1938
| Incumbent re-elected.
| nowrap | 

|-
! 
| Thomas M. Eaton
|  | Republican
| 1938
|  | Incumbent died September 16, 1939.New member elected.Republican hold.
| nowrap | 

|-
! 
| Harry R. Sheppard
|  | Democratic
| 1936
| Incumbent re-elected.
| nowrap | 

|-
! 
| Edouard Izac
|  | Democratic
| 1936
| Incumbent re-elected.
| nowrap | 

|}

Colorado 

|-
! 
| Lawrence Lewis
|  | Democratic
| 1932
| Incumbent re-elected.
| nowrap | 

|-
! 
| Fred N. Cummings
|  | Democratic
| 1932
|  | Incumbent lost re-election.New member elected.Republican gain.
| nowrap | 

|-
! 
| John Andrew Martin
|  | Democratic
| 1932
|  | Incumbent died December 23, 1939.New member elected.Republican gain.Winner did not run to finish the current term.
| nowrap | 

|-
! 
| Edward T. Taylor
|  | Democratic
| 1908
| Incumbent re-elected.
| nowrap | 

|}

Connecticut 

|-
! 
| William J. Miller
|  | Republican
| 1938
|  | Incumbent lost re-election.New member elected.Democratic gain.
| nowrap | 

|-
! 
| Thomas R. Ball
|  | Republican
| 1938
|  | Incumbent lost re-election.New member elected.Democratic gain.
| nowrap | 

|-
! 
| James A. Shanley
|  | Democratic
| 1934
| Incumbent re-elected.
| nowrap | 

|-
! 
| Albert E. Austin
|  | Republican
| 1938
|  | Incumbent lost re-election.New member elected.Democratic gain.
| nowrap | 

|-
! 
| J. Joseph Smith
|  | Democratic
| 1934
| Incumbent re-elected.
| nowrap | 

|-
! 
| B. J. Monkiewicz
|  | Republican
| 1938
|  | Incumbent lost re-election.New member elected.Democratic gain.
| nowrap | 

|}

Delaware 

|-
! 
| George S. Williams
|  | Republican
| 1938
|  | Incumbent lost re-election.New member elected.Democratic gain.
| nowrap | 

|}

Florida 

|-
! 
| J. Hardin Peterson
|  | Democratic
| 1932
| Incumbent re-elected.
| nowrap | 

|-
! 
| Robert A. Green
|  | Democratic
| 1932
| Incumbent re-elected.
| nowrap | 

|-
! 
| Millard F. Caldwell
|  | Democratic
| 1932
|  | Incumbent retired to run for U.S. senator.New member elected.Democratic hold.
| nowrap | 

|-
! 
| Pat Cannon
|  | Democratic
| 1938
| Incumbent re-elected.
| nowrap | 

|-
! 
| Joe Hendricks
|  | Democratic
| 1936
| Incumbent re-elected.
| nowrap | 

|}

Georgia 

|-
! 
| Hugh Peterson
|  | Democratic
| 1934
| Incumbent re-elected.
| nowrap | 

|-
! 
| Edward E. Cox
|  | Democratic
| 1924
| Incumbent re-elected.
| nowrap | 

|-
! 
| Stephen Pace
|  | Democratic
| 1936
| Incumbent re-elected.
| nowrap | 

|-
! 
| Albert Sidney Camp
|  | Democratic
| 1939 
| Incumbent re-elected.
| nowrap | 

|-
! 
| Robert Ramspeck
|  | Democratic
| 1929
| Incumbent re-elected.
| nowrap | 

|-
! 
| Carl Vinson
|  | Democratic
| 1914
| Incumbent re-elected.
| nowrap | 

|-
! 
| Malcolm C. Tarver
|  | Democratic
| 1926
| Incumbent re-elected.
| nowrap | 

|-
! 
| Florence Reville Gibbs
|  | Democratic
| 1940
|  | Incumbent retired.New member elected.Democratic hold.
| nowrap | 

|-
! 
| B. Frank Whelchel
|  | Democratic
| 1934
| Incumbent re-elected.
| nowrap | 

|-
! 
| Paul Brown
|  | Democratic
| 1933 
| Incumbent re-elected.
| nowrap | 

|}

Idaho 

|-
! 
| Compton I. White
|  | Democratic
| 1932
| Incumbent re-elected.
| nowrap | 

|-
! 
| Henry Dworshak
|  | Republican
| 1938
| Incumbent re-elected.
| nowrap | 

|}

Illinois 

|-
! 
| Arthur Wergs Mitchell
|  | Democratic
| 1934
| Incumbent re-elected.
| nowrap | 

|-
! 
| Raymond S. McKeough
|  | Democratic
| 1934
| Incumbent re-elected.
| nowrap | 

|-
! 
| Edward A. Kelly
|  | Democratic
| 1930
| Incumbent re-elected.
| nowrap | 

|-
! 
| Harry P. Beam
|  | Democratic
| 1930
| Incumbent re-elected.
| nowrap | 

|-
! 
| Adolph J. Sabath
|  | Democratic
| 1906
| Incumbent re-elected.
| nowrap | 

|-
! 
| A. F. Maciejewski
|  | Democratic
| 1938
| Incumbent re-elected.
| nowrap | 

|-
! 
| Leonard W. Schuetz
|  | Democratic
| 1930
| Incumbent re-elected.
| nowrap | 

|-
! 
| Leo Kocialkowski
|  | Democratic
| 1932
| Incumbent re-elected.
| nowrap | 

|-
! 
| James McAndrews
|  | Democratic
| 1934
|  | Incumbent lost re-election.New member elected.Republican gain.
| nowrap | 

|-
! 
| Ralph E. Church
|  | Republican
| 1934
|  | Incumbent retired to run for U.S. senator.New member elected.Republican hold.
| nowrap | 

|-
! 
| Chauncey W. Reed
|  | Republican
| 1934
| Incumbent re-elected.
| nowrap | 

|-
! 
| Noah M. Mason
|  | Republican
| 1936
| Incumbent re-elected.
| nowrap | 

|-
! 
| Leo E. Allen
|  | Republican
| 1932
| Incumbent re-elected.
| nowrap | 

|-
! 
| Anton J. Johnson
|  | Republican
| 1938
| Incumbent re-elected.
| nowrap | 

|-
! 
| Robert B. Chiperfield
|  | Republican
| 1938
| Incumbent re-elected.
| nowrap | 

|-
! 
| Everett Dirksen
|  | Republican
| 1932
| Incumbent re-elected.
| nowrap | 

|-
! 
| Leslie C. Arends
|  | Republican
| 1934
| Incumbent re-elected.
| nowrap | 

|-
! 
| Jessie Sumner
|  | Republican
| 1938
| Incumbent re-elected.
| nowrap | 

|-
! 
| William H. Wheat
|  | Republican
| 1938
| Incumbent re-elected.
| nowrap | 

|-
! 
| James M. Barnes
|  | Democratic
| 1938
| Incumbent re-elected.
| nowrap | 

|-
! 
| Frank W. Fries
|  | Democratic
| 1936
|  | Incumbent lost re-election.New member elected.Republican gain.
| nowrap | 

|-
! 
| Edwin M. Schaefer
|  | Democratic
| 1932
| Incumbent re-elected.
| nowrap | 

|-
! 
| Laurence F. Arnold
|  | Democratic
| 1936
| Incumbent re-elected.
| nowrap | 

|-
! 
| Claude V. Parsons
|  | Democratic
| 1930
|  | Incumbent lost re-election.New member elected.Republican gain.
| nowrap | 

|-
! 
| Kent E. Keller
|  | Democratic
| 1930
|  | Incumbent lost re-election.New member elected.Republican gain.
| nowrap | 

|-
! 
| John C. Martin
|  | Democratic
| 1938
|  | Republican gain.
| rowspan=2 nowrap | 

|-
! 
| Thomas Vernor Smith
|  | Democratic
| 1938
|  | Republican gain.

|}

Indiana 

|-
! 
| William T. Schulte
|  | Democratic
| 1932
| Incumbent re-elected.
| nowrap | 

|-
! 
| Charles A. Halleck
|  | Republican
| 1935 
| Incumbent re-elected.
| nowrap | 

|-
! 
| Robert A. Grant
|  | Republican
| 1938
| Incumbent re-elected.
| nowrap | 

|-
! 
| George W. Gillie
|  | Republican
| 1938
| Incumbent re-elected.
| nowrap | 

|-
! 
| Forest A. Harness
|  | Republican
| 1938
| Incumbent re-elected.
| nowrap | 

|-
! 
| Noble J. Johnson
|  | Republican
| 1938
| Incumbent re-elected.
| nowrap | 

|-
! 
| Gerald W. Landis
|  | Republican
| 1938
| Incumbent re-elected.
| nowrap | 

|-
! 
| John W. Boehne Jr.
|  | Democratic
| 1930
| Incumbent re-elected.
| nowrap | 

|-
! 
| Eugene B. Crowe
|  | Democratic
| 1930
|  | Incumbent lost re-election.New member elected.Republican gain.
| nowrap | 

|-
! 
| Raymond S. Springer
|  | Republican
| 1938
| Incumbent re-elected.
| nowrap | 

|-
! 
| William Larrabee
|  | Democratic
| 1930
| Incumbent re-elected.
| nowrap | 

|-
! 
| Louis Ludlow
|  | Democratic
| 1928
| Incumbent re-elected.
| nowrap | 

|}

Iowa 

|-
! 
| Thomas E. Martin
|  | Republican
| 1938
| Incumbent re-elected.
| nowrap | 

|-
! 
| William S. Jacobsen
|  | Democratic
| 1936
| Incumbent re-elected.
| nowrap | 

|-
! 
| John W. Gwynne
|  | Republican
| 1934
| Incumbent re-elected.
| nowrap | 

|-
! 
| Henry O. Talle
|  | Republican
| 1938
| Incumbent re-elected.
| nowrap | 

|-
! 
| Karl M. LeCompte
|  | Republican
| 1938
| Incumbent re-elected.
| nowrap | 

|-
! 
| Robert K. Goodwin
|  | Republican
| 1940 
|  | Incumbent retired.New member elected.Republican hold.
| nowrap | 

|-
! 
| Ben F. Jensen
|  | Republican
| 1938
| Incumbent re-elected.
| nowrap | 

|-
! 
| Fred C. Gilchrist
|  | Republican
| 1930
| Incumbent re-elected.
| nowrap | 

|-
! 
| Vincent F. Harrington
|  | Democratic
| 1936
| Incumbent re-elected.
| nowrap | 

|}

Kansas 

|-
! 
| William P. Lambertson
|  | Republican
| 1928
| Incumbent re-elected.
| nowrap | 

|-
! 
| Ulysses Samuel Guyer
|  | Republican
| 1926
| Incumbent re-elected.
| nowrap | 

|-
! 
| Thomas Daniel Winter
|  | Republican
| 1938
| Incumbent re-elected.
| nowrap | 

|-
! 
| Edward Herbert Rees
|  | Republican
| 1936
| Incumbent re-elected.
| nowrap | 

|-
! 
| John Mills Houston
|  | Democratic
| 1934
| Incumbent re-elected.
| nowrap | 

|-
! 
| Frank Carlson
|  | Republican
| 1934
| Incumbent re-elected.
| nowrap | 

|-
! 
| Clifford R. Hope
|  | Republican
| 1926
| Incumbent re-elected.
| nowrap | 

|}

Kentucky 

|-
! 
| Noble Jones Gregory
|  | Democratic
| 1936
| Incumbent re-elected.
| nowrap | 

|-
! 
| Beverly M. Vincent
|  | Democratic
| 1937 
| Incumbent re-elected.
| nowrap | 

|-
! 
| Emmet O'Neal
|  | Democratic
| 1934
| Incumbent re-elected.
| nowrap | 

|-
! 
| Edward W. Creal
|  | Democratic
| 1935 
| Incumbent re-elected.
| nowrap | 

|-
! 
| Brent Spence
|  | Democratic
| 1930
| Incumbent re-elected.
| nowrap | 

|-
! 
| Virgil Chapman
|  | Democratic
| 1930
| Incumbent re-elected.
| nowrap | 

|-
! 
| Andrew J. May
|  | Democratic
| 1930
| Incumbent re-elected.
| nowrap | 

|-
! 
| Joe B. Bates
|  | Democratic
| 1930
| Incumbent re-elected.
| nowrap | 

|-
! 
| John M. Robsion
|  | Republican
| 1934
| Incumbent re-elected.
| nowrap | 

|}

Louisiana 

Several close allies of former governor Huey Long were defeated in primaries by reform candidates.

|-
! 
| Joachim O. Fernandez
|  | Democratic
| 1930
|  | Incumbent lost renomination.New member elected.Democratic hold.
| nowrap | 

|-
! 
| Paul H. Maloney
|  | Democratic
| 1930
|  | Incumbent lost renomination.New member elected.Democratic hold.
| nowrap | 

|-
! 
| Robert L. Mouton
|  | Democratic
| 1936
|  | Incumbent lost renomination.New member elected.Democratic hold.
| nowrap | 

|-
! 
| Overton Brooks
|  | Democratic
| 1936
| Incumbent re-elected.
| nowrap | 

|-
! 
| Newt V. Mills
|  | Democratic
| 1936
| Incumbent re-elected.
| nowrap | 

|-
! 
| John K. Griffith
|  | Democratic
| 1936
|  | Incumbent lost renomination.New member elected.Democratic hold.
| nowrap | 

|-
! 
| Rene L. De Rouen
|  | Democratic
| 1927
|  | Incumbent retired.New member elected.Democratic hold.
| nowrap | 

|-
! 
| A. Leonard Allen
|  | Democratic
| 1936
| Incumbent re-elected.
| nowrap | 

|}

Maine 

|-
! 
| James C. Oliver
|  | Republican
| 1936
| Incumbent re-elected.
| nowrap | 

|-
! 
| Margaret Chase Smith
|  | Republican
| 1940
| Incumbent re-elected.
| nowrap | 

|-
! 
| Ralph Owen Brewster
|  | Republican
| 1934
|  | Incumbent retired to run for U.S. senator.New member elected.Republican hold.
| nowrap | 

|}

Maryland 

|-
! 
| David Jenkins Ward
|  | Democratic
| 1939 
| Incumbent re-elected.
| nowrap | 

|-
! 
| William P. Cole Jr.
|  | Democratic
| 1930
| Incumbent re-elected.
| nowrap | 

|-
! 
| Thomas D'Alesandro Jr.
|  | Democratic
| 1938
| Incumbent re-elected.
| nowrap | 

|-
! 
| Ambrose Jerome Kennedy
|  | Democratic
| 1932
|  | Incumbent lost renomination.New member elected.Democratic hold.
| nowrap | 

|-
! 
| Lansdale Sasscer
|  | Democratic
| 1939 
| Incumbent re-elected.
| nowrap | 

|-
! 
| William D. Byron
|  | Democratic
| 1938
| Incumbent re-elected.
| nowrap | 

|}

Massachusetts 

|-
! 
| Allen T. Treadway
|  | Republican
| 1912
| Incumbent re-elected.
| nowrap | 

|-
! 
| Charles R. Clason
|  | Republican
| 1936
| Incumbent re-elected.
| nowrap | 

|-
! 
| Joseph E. Casey
|  | Democratic
| 1934
| Incumbent re-elected.
| nowrap | 

|-
! 
| Pehr G. Holmes
|  | Republican
| 1930
| Incumbent re-elected.
| nowrap | 

|-
! 
| Edith Nourse Rogers
|  | Republican
| 1925
| Incumbent re-elected.
| nowrap | 

|-
! 
| George J. Bates
|  | Republican
| 1936
| Incumbent re-elected.
| nowrap | 

|-
! 
| Lawrence J. Connery
|  | Democratic
| 1937 
| Incumbent re-elected.
| nowrap | 

|-
! 
| Arthur D. Healey
|  | Democratic
| 1932
| Incumbent re-elected.
| nowrap | 

|-
! 
| Robert Luce
|  | Republican
| 1936
|  | Incumbent lost re-election.New member elected.Democratic gain.
| nowrap | 

|-
! 
| George H. Tinkham
|  | Republican
| 1914
| Incumbent re-elected.
| nowrap | 

|-
! 
| Thomas A. Flaherty
|  | Democratic
| 1937 
| Incumbent re-elected.
| nowrap | 

|-
! 
| John W. McCormack
|  | Democratic
| 1928
| Incumbent re-elected.
| nowrap | 

|-
! 
| Richard B. Wigglesworth
|  | Republican
| 1928
| Incumbent re-elected.
| nowrap | 

|-
! 
| Joseph W. Martin Jr.
|  | Republican
| 1924
| Incumbent re-elected.
| nowrap | 

|-
! 
| Charles L. Gifford
|  | Republican
| 1922
| Incumbent re-elected.
| nowrap | 

|}

Michigan 

|-
! 
| Rudolph G. Tenerowicz
|  | Democratic
| 1938
| Incumbent re-elected.
| nowrap | 

|-
! 
| Earl C. Michener
|  | Republican
| 1934
| Incumbent re-elected.
| nowrap | 

|-
! 
| Paul W. Shafer
|  | Republican
| 1936
| Incumbent re-elected.
| nowrap | 

|-
! 
| Clare Hoffman
|  | Republican
| 1934
| Incumbent re-elected.
| nowrap | 

|-
! 
| Bartel J. Jonkman
|  | Republican
| 1940 
| Incumbent re-elected.
| nowrap | 

|-
! 
| William W. Blackney
|  | Republican
| 1938
| Incumbent re-elected.
| nowrap | 

|-
! 
| Jesse P. Wolcott
|  | Republican
| 1930
| Incumbent re-elected.
| nowrap | 

|-
! 
| Fred L. Crawford
|  | Republican
| 1934
| Incumbent re-elected.
| nowrap | 

|-
! 
| Albert J. Engel
|  | Republican
| 1934
| Incumbent re-elected.
| nowrap | 

|-
! 
| Roy O. Woodruff
|  | Republican
| 1920
| Incumbent re-elected.
| nowrap | 

|-
! 
| Frederick Van Ness Bradley
|  | Republican
| 1938
| Incumbent re-elected.
| nowrap | 

|-
! 
| Frank Eugene Hook
|  | Democratic
| 1934
| Incumbent re-elected.
| nowrap | 

|-
! 
| Clarence J. McLeod
|  | Republican
| 1938
|  | Incumbent lost re-election.New member elected.Democratic gain.
| nowrap | 

|-
! 
| Louis C. Rabaut
|  | Democratic
| 1934
| Incumbent re-elected.
| nowrap | 

|-
! 
| John Dingell Sr.
|  | Democratic
| 1932
| Incumbent re-elected.
| nowrap | 

|-
! 
| John Lesinski Sr.
|  | Democratic
| 1932
| Incumbent re-elected.
| nowrap | 

|-
! 
| George Anthony Dondero
|  | Republican
| 1932
| Incumbent re-elected.
| nowrap | 

|}

Minnesota 

|-
! 
| August H. Andresen
|  | Republican
| 1934
| Incumbent re-elected.
| nowrap | 

|-
! 
| Elmer Ryan
|  | Democratic
| 1934
|  | Incumbent lost re-election.New member elected.Republican gain.
| nowrap | 

|-
! 
| John G. Alexander
|  | Republican
| 1938
|  | Incumbent lost renomination.New member elected.Republican hold.
| nowrap | 

|-
! 
| Melvin J. Maas
|  | Republican
| 1934
| Incumbent re-elected.
| nowrap | 

|-
! 
| Oscar Youngdahl
|  | Republican
| 1938
| Incumbent re-elected.
| nowrap | 

|-
! 
| Harold Knutson
|  | Republican
| 1934
| Incumbent re-elected.
| nowrap | 

|-
! 
| Herman Carl Andersen
|  | Republican
| 1938
| Incumbent re-elected.
| nowrap | 

|-
! 
| William Alvin Pittenger
|  | Republican
| 1938
| Incumbent re-elected.
| nowrap | 

|-
! 
| Rich T. Buckler
|  | Farmer–Labor
| 1934
| Incumbent re-elected.
| nowrap | 

|}

Mississippi 

|-
! 
| John E. Rankin
|  | Democratic
| 1920
| Incumbent re-elected.
| nowrap | 

|-
! 
| Wall Doxey
|  | Democratic
| 1928
| Incumbent re-elected.
| nowrap | 

|-
! 
| William Madison Whittington
|  | Democratic
| 1924
| Incumbent re-elected.
| nowrap | 

|-
! 
| Aaron L. Ford
|  | Democratic
| 1934
| Incumbent re-elected.
| nowrap | 

|-
! 
| Ross A. Collins
|  | Democratic
| 1936
| Incumbent re-elected.
| nowrap | 

|-
! 
| William M. Colmer
|  | Democratic
| 1932
| Incumbent re-elected.
| nowrap | 

|-
! 
| Dan R. McGehee
|  | Democratic
| 1934
| Incumbent re-elected.
| nowrap | 

|}

Missouri 

|-
! 
| Milton A. Romjue
|  | Democratic
| 1922
| Incumbent re-elected.
| nowrap | 

|-
! 
| William L. Nelson
|  | Democratic
| 1934
| Incumbent re-elected.
| nowrap | 

|-
! 
| Richard M. Duncan
|  | Democratic
| 1932
| Incumbent re-elected.
| nowrap | 

|-
! 
| C. Jasper Bell
|  | Democratic
| 1934
| Incumbent re-elected.
| nowrap | 

|-
! 
| Joe Shannon
|  | Democratic
| 1930
| Incumbent re-elected.
| nowrap | 

|-
! 
| Reuben T. Wood
|  | Democratic
| 1932
|  | Incumbent lost re-election.New member elected.Republican gain.
| nowrap | 

|-
! 
| Dewey Jackson Short
|  | Republican
| 1934
| Incumbent re-elected.
| nowrap | 

|-
! 
| Clyde Williams
|  | Democratic
| 1930
| Incumbent re-elected.
| nowrap | 

|-
! 
| Clarence Cannon
|  | Democratic
| 1922
| Incumbent re-elected.
| nowrap | 

|-
! 
| Orville Zimmerman
|  | Democratic
| 1934
| Incumbent re-elected.
| nowrap | 

|-
! 
| Thomas C. Hennings Jr.
|  | Democratic
| 1934
|  | ?Democratic hold.
| nowrap | 

|-
! 
| Charles Arthur Anderson
|  | Democratic
| 1936
|  | Incumbent lost re-election.New member elected.Republican gain.
| nowrap | 

|-
! 
| John J. Cochran
|  | Democratic
| 1926
| Incumbent re-elected.
| nowrap | 

|}

Montana 

|-
! 
| Jacob Thorkelson
|  | Republican
| 1938
|  | Incumbent lost renomination.New member elected.Republican hold.
| nowrap | 

|-
! 
| James F. O'Connor
|  | Democratic
| 1936
| Incumbent re-elected.
| nowrap | 

|}

Nebraska 

|-
! 
| John Hyde Sweet
|  | Republican
| 1940
|  | Incumbent retired.New member elected.Republican hold.
| nowrap | 

|-
! 
| Charles F. McLaughlin
|  | Democratic
| 1934
| Incumbent re-elected.
| nowrap | 

|-
! 
| Karl Stefan
|  | Republican
| 1934
| Incumbent re-elected.
| nowrap | 

|-
! 
| Carl Curtis
|  | Republican
| 1938
| Incumbent re-elected.
| nowrap | 

|-
! 
| Harry B. Coffee
|  | Democratic
| 1934
| Incumbent re-elected.
| nowrap | 

|}

Nevada 

|-
! 
| James G. Scrugham
|  | Democratic
| 1932
| Incumbent re-elected.
| nowrap | 

|}

New Hampshire 

|-
! 
| Arthur B. Jenks
|  | Republican
| 1938
| Incumbent re-elected.
| nowrap | 

|-
! 
| Foster Waterman Stearns
|  | Republican
| 1938
| Incumbent re-elected.
| nowrap | 

|}

New Jersey 

|-
! 
| Charles A. Wolverton
|  | Republican
| 1926
| Incumbent re-elected.
| nowrap | 

|-
! 
| Walter S. Jeffries
|  | Republican
| 1938
|  | Incumbent lost re-election.New member elected.Democratic gain.
| nowrap | 

|-
! 
| William H. Sutphin
|  | Democratic
| 1930
| Incumbent re-elected.
| nowrap | 

|-
! 
| D. Lane Powers
|  | Republican
| 1932
| Incumbent re-elected.
| nowrap | 

|-
! 
| Charles A. Eaton
|  | Republican
| 1924
| Incumbent re-elected.
| nowrap | 

|-
! 
| Donald H. McLean
|  | Republican
| 1932
| Incumbent re-elected.
| nowrap | 

|-
! 
| J. Parnell Thomas
|  | Republican
| 1936
| Incumbent re-elected.
| nowrap | 

|-
! 
| George N. Seger
|  | Republican
| 1922
|  | Incumbent died August 26, 1940.New member elected.Republican hold.
| nowrap | 

|-
! 
| Frank C. Osmers Jr.
|  | Republican
| 1938
| Incumbent re-elected.
| nowrap | 

|-
! 
| Fred A. Hartley Jr.
|  | Republican
| 1928
| Incumbent re-elected.
| nowrap | 

|-
! 
| Albert L. Vreeland
|  | Republican
| 1938
| Incumbent re-elected.
| nowrap | 

|-
! 
| Robert Kean
|  | Republican
| 1938
| Incumbent re-elected.
| nowrap | 

|-
! 
| Mary Teresa Norton
|  | Democratic
| 1924
| Incumbent re-elected.
| nowrap | 

|-
! 
| Edward J. Hart
|  | Democratic
| 1934
| Incumbent re-elected.
| nowrap | 

|}

New Mexico 

|-
! 
| John J. Dempsey
|  | Democratic
| 1934
|  | Incumbent retired to run for U.S. senator.New member elected.Democratic hold.
| nowrap | 

|}

New York 

|-
! 
| Leonard W. Hall
|  | Republican
| 1938
| Incumbent re-elected.
| nowrap | 

|-
! 
| William Bernard Barry
|  | Democratic
| 1935 
| Incumbent re-elected.
| nowrap | 

|-
! 
| Joseph L. Pfeifer
|  | Democratic
| 1934
| Incumbent re-elected.
| nowrap | 

|-
! 
| Thomas H. Cullen
|  | Democratic
| 1918
| Incumbent re-elected.
| nowrap | 

|-
! 
| Marcellus H. Evans
|  | Democratic
| 1934
|  | Incumbent lost renomination.New member elected.Defeated as RepublicanDemocratic hold.
| nowrap | 

|-
! 
| Andrew Lawrence Somers
|  | Democratic
| 1924
| Incumbent re-elected.
| nowrap | 

|-
! 
| John J. Delaney
|  | Democratic
| 1931
| Incumbent re-elected.
| nowrap | 

|-
! 
| Donald L. O'Toole
|  | Democratic
| 1936
| Incumbent re-elected.
| nowrap | 

|-
! 
| Eugene James Keogh
|  | Democratic
| 1936
| Incumbent re-elected.
| nowrap | 

|-
! 
| Emanuel Celler
|  | Democratic
| 1922
| Incumbent re-elected.
| nowrap | 

|-
! 
| James A. O'Leary
|  | Democratic
| 1934
| Incumbent re-elected.
| nowrap | 

|-
! 
| Samuel Dickstein
|  | Democratic
| 1922
| Incumbent re-elected.
| nowrap | 

|-
! 
| Christopher D. Sullivan
|  | Democratic
| 1916
|  | Incumbent retired.New member elected.Democratic hold.
| nowrap | 

|-
! 
| Morris Michael Edelstein
|  | Democratic
| 1940
| Incumbent re-elected.
| nowrap | 

|-
! 
| Michael J. Kennedy
|  | Democratic
| 1938
| Incumbent re-elected.
| nowrap | 

|-
! 
| James H. Fay
|  | Democratic
| 1938
|  | Incumbent lost re-election.New member elected.Republican gain.
| nowrap | 

|-
! 
| Bruce Fairchild Barton
|  | Republican
| 1937 
|  | Incumbent retired to run for U.S. senator.New member elected.Republican hold.
| nowrap | 

|-
! 
| Martin J. Kennedy
|  | Democratic
| 1930
| Incumbent re-elected.
| nowrap | 

|-
! 
| Sol Bloom
|  | Democratic
| 1923
| Incumbent re-elected.
| nowrap | 

|-
! 
| Vito Marcantonio
|  | Labor
| 1938
| Incumbent re-elected.
| nowrap | 

|-
! 
| Joseph A. Gavagan
|  | Democratic
| 1929
| Incumbent re-elected.
| nowrap | 

|-
! 
| Walter A. Lynch
|  | Democratic
| 1940
| Incumbent re-elected.
| nowrap | 

|-
! 
| Charles A. Buckley
|  | Democratic
| 1934
| Incumbent re-elected.
| nowrap | 

|-
! 
| James M. Fitzpatrick
|  | Democratic
| 1926
| Incumbent re-elected.
| nowrap | 

|-
! 
| Ralph A. Gamble
|  | Republican
| 1937 
| Incumbent re-elected.
| nowrap | 

|-
! 
| Hamilton Fish III
|  | Republican
| 1920
| Incumbent re-elected.
| nowrap | 

|-
! 
| Lewis K. Rockefeller
|  | Republican
| 1937 
| Incumbent re-elected.
| nowrap | 

|-
! 
| William T. Byrne
|  | Democratic
| 1936
| Incumbent re-elected.
| nowrap | 

|-
! 
| E. Harold Cluett
|  | Republican
| 1936
| Incumbent re-elected.
| nowrap | 

|-
! 
| Frank Crowther
|  | Republican
| 1918
| Incumbent re-elected.
| nowrap | 

|-
! 
| Clarence E. Kilburn
|  | Republican
| 1940
| Incumbent re-elected.
| nowrap | 

|-
! 
| Francis D. Culkin
|  | Republican
| 1928
| Incumbent re-elected.
| nowrap | 

|-
! 
| Fred J. Douglas
|  | Republican
| 1936
| Incumbent re-elected.
| nowrap | 

|-
! 
| Edwin Arthur Hall
|  | Republican
| 1939 
| Incumbent re-elected.
| nowrap | 

|-
! 
| Clarence E. Hancock
|  | Republican
| 1927
| Incumbent re-elected.
| nowrap | 

|-
! 
| John Taber
|  | Republican
| 1922
| Incumbent re-elected.
| nowrap | 

|-
! 
| W. Sterling Cole
|  | Republican
| 1934
| Incumbent re-elected.
| nowrap | 

|-
! 
| Joseph J. O'Brien
|  | Republican
| 1938
| Incumbent re-elected.
| nowrap | 

|-
! 
| James Wolcott Wadsworth Jr.
|  | Republican
| 1932
| Incumbent re-elected.
| nowrap | 

|-
! 
| Walter Gresham Andrews
|  | Republican
| 1930
| Incumbent re-elected.
| nowrap | 

|-
! 
| J. Francis Harter
|  | Republican
| 1938
|  | Incumbent lost re-election.New member elected.Democratic gain.
| nowrap | 

|-
! 
| Pius L. Schwert
|  | Democratic
| 1938
| Incumbent re-elected.
| nowrap | 

|-
! 
| Daniel A. Reed
|  | Republican
| 1918
| Incumbent re-elected.
| nowrap | 

|-
! 
| Caroline O'Day
|  | Democratic
| 1934
| Incumbent re-elected.
| rowspan=2 nowrap | 

|-
! 
| Matthew J. Merritt
|  | Democratic
| 1934
| Incumbent re-elected.

|}

North Carolina 

|-
! 
| Lindsay C. Warren
|  | Democratic
| 1924
|  | Incumbent resigned to become Comptroller General.New member elected.Democratic hold.
| nowrap | 

|-
! 
| John H. Kerr
|  | Democratic
| 1923
| Incumbent re-elected.
| nowrap | 

|-
! 
| Graham Arthur Barden
|  | Democratic
| 1934
| Incumbent re-elected.
| nowrap | 

|-
! 
| Harold D. Cooley
|  | Democratic
| 1934
| Incumbent re-elected.
| nowrap | 

|-
! 
| Alonzo Dillard Folger
|  | Democratic
| 1938
| Incumbent re-elected.
| nowrap | 

|-
! 
| Carl T. Durham
|  | Democratic
| 1938
| Incumbent re-elected.
| nowrap | 

|-
! 
| J. Bayard Clark
|  | Democratic
| 1928
| Incumbent re-elected.
| nowrap | 

|-
! 
| William O. Burgin
|  | Democratic
| 1938
| Incumbent re-elected.
| nowrap | 

|-
! 
| Robert L. Doughton
|  | Democratic
| 1910
| Incumbent re-elected.
| nowrap | 

|-
! 
| Alfred L. Bulwinkle
|  | Democratic
| 1930
| Incumbent re-elected.
| nowrap | 

|-
! 
| Zebulon Weaver
|  | Democratic
| 1930
| Incumbent re-elected.
| nowrap | 

|}

North Dakota 

|-
! 
| Usher L. Burdick
|  | Republican
| 1934
| Incumbent re-elected.
| rowspan=2 nowrap | 

|-
! 
| William Lemke
|  | Republican
| 1932
|  | Incumbent retired to run for U.S. senator.New member elected.Republican hold.

|}

Ohio 

|-
! 
| Charles H. Elston
|  | Republican
| 1938
| Incumbent re-elected.
| nowrap | 

|-
! 
| William E. Hess
|  | Republican
| 1938
| Incumbent re-elected.
| nowrap | 

|-
! 
| Harry N. Routzohn
|  | Republican
| 1938
|  | Incumbent lost re-election.New member elected.Democratic gain.
| nowrap | 

|-
! 
| Robert Franklin Jones
|  | Republican
| 1938
| Incumbent re-elected.
| nowrap | 

|-
! 
| Cliff Clevenger
|  | Republican
| 1938
| Incumbent re-elected.
| nowrap | 

|-
! 
| James G. Polk
|  | Democratic
| 1930
|  | Incumbent retired.New member elected.Democratic hold.
| nowrap | 

|-
! 
| Clarence J. Brown
|  | Republican
| 1938
| Incumbent re-elected.
| nowrap | 

|-
! 
| Frederick C. Smith
|  | Republican
| 1938
| Incumbent re-elected.
| nowrap | 

|-
! 
| John F. Hunter
|  | Democratic
| 1936
| Incumbent re-elected.
| nowrap | 

|-
! 
| Thomas A. Jenkins
|  | Republican
| 1924
| Incumbent re-elected.
| nowrap | 

|-
! 
| Harold K. Claypool
|  | Democratic
| 1936
| Incumbent re-elected.
| nowrap | 

|-
! 
| John M. Vorys
|  | Republican
| 1938
| Incumbent re-elected.
| nowrap | 

|-
! 
| Dudley A. White
|  | Republican
| 1936
|  | Incumbent retired to run for U.S. senator.New member elected.Republican hold.
| nowrap | 

|-
! 
| Dow W. Harter
|  | Democratic
| 1932
| Incumbent re-elected.
| nowrap | 

|-
! 
| Robert T. Secrest
|  | Democratic
| 1932
| Incumbent re-elected.
| nowrap | 

|-
! 
| James Seccombe
|  | Republican
| 1938
|  | Incumbent lost re-election.New member elected.Democratic gain.
| nowrap | 

|-
! 
| J. Harry McGregor
|  | Republican
| 1940
| Incumbent re-elected.
| nowrap | 

|-
! 
| Earl R. Lewis
|  | Republican
| 1938
|  | Incumbent lost re-election.New member elected.Democratic gain.
| nowrap | 

|-
! 
| Michael J. Kirwan
|  | Democratic
| 1936
| Incumbent re-elected.
| nowrap | 

|-
! 
| Martin L. Sweeney
|  | Democratic
| 1931
| Incumbent re-elected.
| nowrap | 

|-
! 
| Robert Crosser
|  | Democratic
| 1922
| Incumbent re-elected.
| nowrap | 

|-
! 
| Frances P. Bolton
|  | Republican
| 1940
| Incumbent re-elected.
| nowrap | 

|-
! 
| George H. Bender
|  | Republican
| 1938
| Incumbent re-elected.
| rowspan=2 nowrap | 

|-
! 
| L. L. Marshall
|  | Republican
| 1938
|  | Incumbent lost re-election.New member elected.Democratic gain.

|}

Oklahoma 

|-
! 
| Wesley E. Disney
|  | Democratic
| 1930
| Incumbent re-elected.
| nowrap | 

|-
! 
| John Conover Nichols
|  | Democratic
| 1934
| Incumbent re-elected.
| nowrap | 

|-
! 
| Wilburn Cartwright
|  | Democratic
| 1926
| Incumbent re-elected.
| nowrap | 

|-
! 
| Lyle Boren
|  | Democratic
| 1936
| Incumbent re-elected.
| nowrap | 

|-
! 
| A. S. Mike Monroney
|  | Democratic
| 1938
| Incumbent re-elected.
| nowrap | 

|-
! 
| Jed Johnson
|  | Democratic
| 1926
| Incumbent re-elected.
| nowrap | 

|-
! 
| Sam C. Massingale
|  | Democratic
| 1934
| Incumbent re-elected.
| nowrap | 

|-
! 
| Phil Ferguson
|  | Democratic
| 1934
|  | Incumbent lost re-election.New member elected.Republican gain.
| nowrap | 

|-
! 
| Will Rogers
|  | Democratic
| 1932
| Incumbent re-elected.
| nowrap | 

|}

Oregon 

|-
! 
| James W. Mott
|  | Republican
| 1932
| Incumbent re-elected.
| nowrap | 

|-
! 
| Walter M. Pierce
|  | Democratic
| 1932
| Incumbent re-elected.
| nowrap | 

|-
! 
| Homer D. Angell
|  | Republican
| 1938
| Incumbent re-elected.
| nowrap | 

|}

Pennsylvania 

|-
! 
| Leon Sacks
|  | Democratic
| 1936
| Incumbent re-elected.
| nowrap | 

|-
! 
| James P. McGranery
|  | Democratic
| 1936
| Incumbent re-elected.
| nowrap | 

|-
! 
| Michael J. Bradley
|  | Democratic
| 1936
| Incumbent re-elected.
| nowrap | 

|-
! 
| John E. Sheridan
|  | Democratic
| 1939 
| Incumbent re-elected.
| nowrap | 

|-
! 
| Fred C. Gartner
|  | Republican
| 1938
|  | Incumbent lost re-election.New member elected.Democratic gain.
| nowrap | 

|-
! 
| Francis J. Myers
|  | Democratic
| 1938
| Incumbent re-elected.
| nowrap | 

|-
! 
| George P. Darrow
|  | Republican
| 1938
|  | Incumbent retired.New member elected.Republican hold.
| nowrap | 

|-
! 
| James Wolfenden
|  | Republican
| 1928
| Incumbent re-elected.
| nowrap | 

|-
! 
| Charles L. Gerlach
|  | Republican
| 1938
| Incumbent re-elected.
| nowrap | 

|-
! 
| J. Roland Kinzer
|  | Republican
| 1930
| Incumbent re-elected.
| nowrap | 

|-
! 
| Patrick J. Boland
|  | Democratic
| 1930
| Incumbent re-elected.
| nowrap | 

|-
! 
| J. Harold Flannery
|  | Democratic
| 1936
| Incumbent re-elected.
| nowrap | 

|-
! 
| Ivor D. Fenton
|  | Republican
| 1938
| Incumbent re-elected.
| nowrap | 

|-
! 
| Guy L. Moser
|  | Democratic
| 1936
| Incumbent re-elected.
| nowrap | 

|-
! 
| Albert G. Rutherford
|  | Republican
| 1936
| Incumbent re-elected.
| nowrap | 

|-
! 
| Robert F. Rich
|  | Republican
| 1930
| Incumbent re-elected.
| nowrap | 

|-
! 
| J. William Ditter
|  | Republican
| 1932
| Incumbent re-elected.
| nowrap | 

|-
! 
| Richard M. Simpson
|  | Republican
| 1937 
| Incumbent re-elected.
| nowrap | 

|-
! 
| John C. Kunkel
|  | Republican
| 1938
| Incumbent re-elected.
| nowrap | 

|-
! 
| Benjamin Jarrett
|  | Republican
| 1936
| Incumbent re-elected.
| nowrap | 

|-
! 
| Francis E. Walter
|  | Democratic
| 1932
| Incumbent re-elected.
| nowrap | 

|-
! 
| Chester H. Gross
|  | Republican
| 1938
|  | Incumbent lost re-election.New member elected.Democratic gain.
| nowrap | 

|-
! 
| James E. Van Zandt
|  | Republican
| 1938
| Incumbent re-elected.
| nowrap | 

|-
! 
| J. Buell Snyder
|  | Democratic
| 1932
| Incumbent re-elected.
| nowrap | 

|-
! 
| Charles I. Faddis
|  | Democratic
| 1932
| Incumbent re-elected.
| nowrap | 

|-
! 
| Louis E. Graham
|  | Republican
| 1938
| Incumbent re-elected.
| nowrap | 

|-
! 
| Harve Tibbott
|  | Republican
| 1938
| Incumbent re-elected.
| nowrap | 

|-
! 
| Robert G. Allen
|  | Democratic
| 1936
|  | Incumbent retired.New member elected.Democratic hold.
| nowrap | 

|-
! 
| Robert L. Rodgers
|  | Republican
| 1938
| Incumbent re-elected.
| nowrap | 

|-
! 
| Robert J. Corbett
|  | Republican
| 1938
|  | Incumbent lost re-election.New member elected.Democratic gain.
| nowrap | 

|-
! 
| John McDowell
|  | Republican
| 1938
|  | Incumbent lost re-election.New member elected.Democratic gain.
| nowrap | 

|-
! 
| Herman P. Eberharter
|  | Democratic
| 1936
| Incumbent re-elected.
| nowrap | 

|-
! 
| Joseph A. McArdle
|  | Democratic
| 1938
| Incumbent re-elected.
| nowrap | 

|-
! 
| Matthew A. Dunn
|  | Democratic
| 1932
|  | Incumbent retired.New member elected.Democratic hold.
| nowrap | 

|}

Rhode Island 

|-
! 
| Charles Risk
|  | Republican
| 1938
|  | Incumbent lost re-election.New member elected.Democratic gain.
| nowrap | 

|-
! 
| Harry Sandager
|  | Republican
| 1938
|  | Incumbent lost re-election.New member elected.Democratic gain.
| nowrap | 

|}

South Carolina 

|-
! 
| Clara Gooding McMillan
|  | Democratic
| 1939 
|  | Incumbent retired.New member elected.Democratic hold.
| nowrap | 

|-
! 
| Hampton P. Fulmer
|  | Democratic
| 1920
| Incumbent re-elected.
| nowrap | 

|-
! 
| Butler B. Hare
|  | Democratic
| 1938
| Incumbent re-elected.
| nowrap | 

|-
! 
| Joseph R. Bryson
|  | Democratic
| 1938
| Incumbent re-elected.
| nowrap | 

|-
! 
| James P. Richards
|  | Democratic
| 1932
| Incumbent re-elected.
| nowrap | 

|-
! 
| John L. McMillan
|  | Democratic
| 1938
| Incumbent re-elected.
| nowrap | 

|}

South Dakota 

|-
! 
| Karl E. Mundt
|  | Republican
| 1938
| Incumbent re-elected.
| nowrap | 

|-
! 
| Francis H. Case
|  | Republican
| 1936
| Incumbent re-elected.
| nowrap | 

|}

Tennessee 

|-
! 
| B. Carroll Reece
|  | Republican
| 1932
| Incumbent re-elected.
| nowrap | 

|-
! 
| John Jennings
|  | Republican
| 1939 
| Incumbent re-elected.
| nowrap | 

|-
! 
| Estes Kefauver
|  | Democratic
| 1939 
| Incumbent re-elected.
| nowrap | 

|-
! 
| Albert Gore Sr.
|  | Democratic
| 1938
| Incumbent re-elected.
| nowrap | 

|-
! 
| Joseph W. Byrns Jr.
|  | Democratic
| 1938
|  | Incumbent lost re-election.New member elected.Independent gain.Winner subsequently joined Democratic caucus.
| nowrap | 

|-
! 
| W. Wirt Courtney
|  | Democratic
| 1939 
| Incumbent re-elected.
| nowrap | 

|-
! 
| Herron C. Pearson
|  | Democratic
| 1934
| Incumbent re-elected.
| nowrap | 

|-
! 
| Jere Cooper
|  | Democratic
| 1928
| Incumbent re-elected.
| nowrap | 

|-
! 
| Clifford Davis
|  | Democratic
| 1940
| Incumbent re-elected.
| nowrap | 

|}

Texas 

|-
! 
| Wright Patman
|  | Democratic
| 1928
| Incumbent re-elected.
| nowrap | 

|-
! 
| Martin Dies Jr.
|  | Democratic
| 1930
| Incumbent re-elected.
| nowrap | 

|-
! 
| Lindley Beckworth
|  | Democratic
| 1938
| Incumbent re-elected.
| nowrap | 

|-
! 
| Sam Rayburn
|  | Democratic
| 1912
| Incumbent re-elected.
| nowrap | 

|-
! 
| Hatton W. Sumners
|  | Democratic
| 1914
| Incumbent re-elected.
| nowrap | 

|-
! 
| Luther A. Johnson
|  | Democratic
| 1922
| Incumbent re-elected.
| nowrap | 

|-
! 
| Nat Patton
|  | Democratic
| 1934
| Incumbent re-elected.
| nowrap | 

|-
! 
| Albert Thomas
|  | Democratic
| 1936
| Incumbent re-elected.
| nowrap | 

|-
! 
| Joseph J. Mansfield
|  | Democratic
| 1916
| Incumbent re-elected.
| nowrap | 

|-
! 
| Lyndon B. Johnson
|  | Democratic
| 1937 
| Incumbent re-elected.
| nowrap | 

|-
! 
| William R. Poage
|  | Democratic
| 1936
| Incumbent re-elected.
| nowrap | 

|-
! 
| Fritz G. Lanham
|  | Democratic
| 1919
| Incumbent re-elected.
| nowrap | 

|-
! 
| Ed Gossett
|  | Democratic
| 1938
| Incumbent re-elected.
| nowrap | 

|-
! 
| Richard M. Kleberg
|  | Democratic
| 1931
| Incumbent re-elected.
| nowrap | 

|-
! 
| Milton H. West
|  | Democratic
| 1933 
| Incumbent re-elected.
| nowrap | 

|-
! 
| R. Ewing Thomason
|  | Democratic
| 1930
| Incumbent re-elected.
| nowrap | 

|-
! 
| Clyde L. Garrett
|  | Democratic
| 1936
|  | Incumbent lost renomination.New member elected.Democratic hold.
| nowrap | 

|-
! 
| John Marvin Jones
|  | Democratic
| 1916
|  | Incumbent retired to become judge on United States Court of Claims.New member elected.Democratic hold.
| nowrap | 

|-
! 
| George H. Mahon
|  | Democratic
| 1934
| Incumbent re-elected.
| nowrap | 

|-
! 
| Paul J. Kilday
|  | Democratic
| 1938
| Incumbent re-elected.
| nowrap | 

|-
! 
| Charles L. South
|  | Democratic
| 1934
| Incumbent re-elected.
| nowrap | 

|}

Utah 

|-
! 
| Orrice Abram Murdock Jr.
|  | Democratic
| 1932
|  | Incumbent retired to run for U.S. senator.New member elected.Democratic hold.
| nowrap | 

|-
! 
| J. W. Robinson
|  | Democratic
| 1932
| Incumbent re-elected.
| nowrap | 

|}

Vermont 

|-
! 
| Charles Albert Plumley
|  | Republican
| 1934
| Incumbent re-elected.
| nowrap | 

|}

Virginia 

|-
! 
| S. Otis Bland
|  | Democratic
| 1918
| Incumbent re-elected.
| nowrap | 

|-
! 
| Colgate Darden
|  | Democratic
| 1938
| Incumbent re-elected.
| nowrap | 

|-
! 
| Dave E. Satterfield Jr.
|  | Democratic
| 1937 
| Incumbent re-elected.
| nowrap | 

|-
! 
| Patrick H. Drewry
|  | Democratic
| 1920
| Incumbent re-elected.
| nowrap | 

|-
! 
| Thomas G. Burch
|  | Democratic
| 1930
| Incumbent re-elected.
| nowrap | 

|-
! 
| Clifton A. Woodrum
|  | Democratic
| 1922
| Incumbent re-elected.
| nowrap | 

|-
! 
| Absalom Willis Robertson
|  | Democratic
| 1932
| Incumbent re-elected.
| nowrap | 

|-
! 
| Howard W. Smith
|  | Democratic
| 1930
| Incumbent re-elected.
| nowrap | 

|-
! 
| John W. Flannagan Jr.
|  | Democratic
| 1930
| Incumbent re-elected.
| nowrap | 

|}

Washington 

|-
! 
| Warren Magnuson
|  | Democratic
| 1936
| Incumbent re-elected.
| nowrap | 

|-
! 
| Monrad C. Wallgren
|  | Democratic
| 1932
|  | Incumbent retired to run for U.S. senator.New member elected.Democratic hold.
| nowrap | 

|-
! 
| Martin F. Smith
|  | Democratic
| 1932
| Incumbent re-elected.
| nowrap | 

|-
! 
| Knute Hill
|  | Democratic
| 1932
| Incumbent re-elected.
| nowrap | 

|-
! 
| Charles H. Leavy
|  | Democratic
| 1936
| Incumbent re-elected.
| nowrap | 

|-
! 
| John M. Coffee
|  | Democratic
| 1936
| Incumbent re-elected.
| nowrap | 

|}

West Virginia 

|-
! 
| A. C. Schiffler
|  | Republican
| 1938
|  | Incumbent lost re-election.New member elected.Democratic gain.
| nowrap | 

|-
! 
| Jennings Randolph
|  | Democratic
| 1932
| Incumbent re-elected.
| nowrap | 

|-
! 
| Andrew Edmiston Jr.
|  | Democratic
| 1933 
| Incumbent re-elected.
| nowrap | 

|-
! 
| George William Johnson
|  | Democratic
| 1932
| Incumbent re-elected.
| nowrap | 

|-
! 
| John Kee
|  | Democratic
| 1932
| Incumbent re-elected.
| nowrap | 

|-
! 
| Joe L. Smith
|  | Democratic
| 1928
| Incumbent re-elected.
| nowrap | 

|}

Wisconsin 

|-
! 
| Stephen Bolles
|  | Republican
| 1938
| Incumbent re-elected.
| nowrap | 

|-
! 
| Charles Hawks Jr.
|  | Republican
| 1938
|  | Incumbent lost re-election.New member elected.Progressive gain.
| nowrap | 

|-
! 
| Harry W. Griswold
|  | Republican
| 1938
|  | Incumbent died July 4, 1939.New member elected.Republican hold.
| nowrap | 

|-
! 
| John C. Schafer
|  | Republican
| 1938
|  | Incumbent lost re-election.New member elected.Democratic gain.
| nowrap | 

|-
! 
| Lewis D. Thill
|  | Republican
| 1938
| Incumbent re-elected.
| nowrap | 

|-
! 
| Frank B. Keefe
|  | Republican
| 1938
| Incumbent re-elected.
| nowrap | 

|-
! 
| Reid F. Murray
|  | Republican
| 1938
| Incumbent re-elected.
| nowrap | 

|-
! 
| Joshua L. Johns
|  | Republican
| 1938
| Incumbent re-elected.
| nowrap | 

|-
! 
| Merlin Hull
|  | Progressive
| 1934
| Incumbent re-elected.
| nowrap | 

|-
! 
| Bernard J. Gehrmann
|  | Progressive
| 1934
| Incumbent re-elected.
| nowrap | 

|}

Wyoming 

|-
! 
| Frank O. Horton
|  | Republican
| 1938
|  | Incumbent lost re-election.New member elected.Democratic gain.
| nowrap | 

|}

Non-voting delegates 

After two cycles of electing its delegate in September, Alaska Territory returned to a November election.

|-
! 
| Anthony Dimond
|  | Democratic
| 1932
| Incumbent re-elected.
| nowrap | 

|}

See also
 1940 United States elections
 1940 United States Senate elections
 1940 United States presidential election
 76th United States Congress
 77th United States Congress

Notes

References